Fishtail Lake is a lake in the municipality of Dysart et al, Haliburton County in Central Ontario, Canada. It is on Allen Creek and is in the Ottawa River drainage basin.

Geography
From the air the lake looks like a fish, with its head facing west and its upraised tail facing northeast. The nearest named community is Kennaway,  to the east.

The primary inflow is Allen Creek, arriving at the west from the direction of Allen Lake. There are five unnamed secondary inflows: one at the south; two at the northeast, including one arriving from Luke Lake; one at the north; and one at the northwest. The primary outflow, at the northeast end of the lake, is also Allen Creek, which flows via Benoir Lake, the York River and the Madawaska River to the Ottawa River.

References

Lakes of Haliburton County